The Grendel P30 is a semi-automatic pistol chambered in .22 Winchester Magnum Rimfire. Designed by George Kellgren and manufactured by Grendel Inc., it uses a 30-round Zytel magazine and was available with a 5 or 8 inch barrel.  A carbine version (R-31) was also offered.  It was manufactured from 1990 to 1994.

The P-30 uses a straight blow-back operation, with the assistance of a fluted chamber to reduce case friction during extraction.

See also
 Kel-Tec PMR-30

References

External links
 Manual

Semi-automatic pistols of the United States